Taylorsville Times is  a weekly newspaper based in Taylorsville, North Carolina covering Alexander County.

References

Weekly newspapers published in North Carolina
Alexander County, North Carolina